Welshpool Football Club was an Australian rules football club that participated in the Alberton Football League from 1946 up until 1994. With the continual struggle to entice outside players to the club and a constant strain in retaining local juniors due to lack of employment opportunities, the club ventured into amalgamation talks with neighbouring football clubs Devon and Toora. The outcome would eventually see the club join forces with the Devon Football Club prior to the start of the 1995 Alberton League season.
The newly formed Devon-Welshpool Football Club would experience immediate success by claiming the 1995 Alberton League premiership with a six-point triumph over Won Wron-Woodside, winning 11.8 (74) to 10.8 (68) in the last Grand Final played at Yarram.

Early history
Welshpool's earliest history dates back to 1895 but an official date of when the club was formed is not known but there are reports that the club was active during this period. In fact, Welshpool's first known premiership came when it defeated Foster for the 1912 South Gippsland Football Association premiership. However, the club withdrew from competing in random seasons on numerous occasions and a true gathering of the early history is hard to report on. After a very poor start to the 1911 season and only four wins, Welshpool withdrew from the Association. Even after winning the 1912 premiership, Welshpool again withdrew from the 1913 season and many of the club's leading players joined neighboring rivals. Much of the local football played between 1915 and 1917 was junior matches due to World War I.

1946: Entry to the AFL
At the club's annual general meeting in 1946, the WFC decided to join the reforming Alberton Football League, and was a part of the competition up until its independent demise in 1994. The team became known as the "Tri-colours" and was later changed to become the Bulldogs.

In the early season upon the reformation of the league, Welshpool were a regular finalist and made it to the 1949 Grand Final. However, the dominant Woodside combination of this era would deny the Bulldogs of a premiership by 16 points and two years later would again prevent the club from attaining the ultimate success by claiming another AFL flag, this time by nine points.

Welshpool's great players of these earlier years of the AFL were Robert "Bob" Roberts, Alec Grossman, Keith Forbes, Ken Macphail, Robert Sutherland and Les Murray to name a few. Roberts, who came close to winning the League Best & Fairest award in 1950, would win the club's top honour an unprecedented four times during his illustrious career with the Bulldogs.

1969–1971: Premiership years
With former North Melbourne player Adrian Beer taking over as coach, Welshpool went 15–3 in 1969, finishing as the minor premiers for a second consecutive year.  Rover, Paul Sutherland claimed what no other Welshpool player had been able to do since the re-formation of the AFL in 1946 and that was to win League Best & Fairest award.  Ron Tibballs was the club's leading goalkicker for the sixth time with 99 goals, also winning his second AFL goalkicking award.  The Bulldogs then went on to win their first premiership in seven years and inflict their second Grand Final defeat over Fish Creek in as many years.

Welshpool again dominated throughout 1970 and were able to produce what no other club has been able to do and that was sustain an unblemished record for the duration of the home and away season with 18 wins and 0 losses in an extraordinary accomplishment. The season included their greatest ever comeback from three-quarter time as the Bulldogs reeled in a 31-point deficit to eventually prevail over Devon by the narrowest of margins, winning 13.9 (87) to 13.8 (86). This time Ron Tibballs was able to achieve 100 goals in the home and away season, which he reached in round 17 against Won Wron before finishing the year with 117 – surpassing Won Wron's Ben "Sonny" Davis' record of 105 in 1957.

1979: Our last premiership
A heavy recruiting campaign saw Welshpool throw themselves in the mix as a finals contender, something they had not been a part of since the 1975 season under Laurie Rippon. Former Melbourne and Foster player, Chris Aitken, was appointed coach in 1978 and returned for the 1979 season with a bold plan to make the final four. Chris Hayes, Billy Lynch jnr., Mark James, and Glen James were a number of newcomers to the Bulldogs while Neil Chandler and Bruce Pickering were both enticed to rejoin the club mid-season in an attempt to attain the ultimate success.

Honour roll

Match records

Final season: 1994
Saturday 20 August 1994 would prove to be the final time in the proud history of the Welshpool Football Club that a football team would wear the red, white and blue colours for the beloved Bulldogs. The very last match would be played against neighbouring rival, Toora, with Welshpool winning by two points, 16.10 (106) to 15.14 (104).

{| class="wikitable" style="margin: 1em auto 1em auto"
|-
!colspan="21" | Welshpool Season 1994
|-
!Round 1
| Devon (A) || 10.8 (68) – 18.15 (123) || Win
|-
!Round 2
| Meeniyan-Dumbalk United (H) || 10.7 (67) – 17.13 (115) || Loss
|-
!Round 3
| Yarram (A) || 16.15 (111) – 14.14 (98) || Loss
|-
!Round 4
| Foster (H) || 14.13 (97) – 12.7 (79) || Win
|-
!Round 5
| Tarwin (A) || 12.14 (86) – 10.9 (69) || Loss
|-
!Round 6
| Stony Creek (A) || 4.5 (29) – 20.16 (136) || Win
|-
!Round 7
| Won Wron-Woodside (H) || 6.6 (42) – 11.13 (79) || Loss
|-
!Round 8
| Fish Creek (A) || 16.16(112) – 13.10 (88) || Loss
|-
!Round 9
| Toora (H) || 19.15 (129) – 9.9 (63) || Win
|-
!Round 10
| Devon (H) || 16.11 (107) – 16.7 (103) || Win
|-
!Round 11
| Meeniyan-Dumbalk United (A) || 14.12 (96) – 9.7 (61) || Loss
|-
!Round 12
| Yarram (H) || 10.13 (73) – 17.13 (115) || Loss
|-
!Round 13
| Foster (A) || 12.11 (83) – 8.15 (63) || Loss
|-
!Round 14
| Tarwin (H) || 16.16 (106) – 14.20 (104) || Win
|-
!Round 15
| Stony Creek (H) || 14.16 (100) – 11.12 (79) || Win
|-
!Round 16
| Won Wron-Woodside (A) || 23.14 (152) – 9.9 (63) || Loss
|-
!Round 17
| Fish Creek (H) || 3.3 (21) – 16.14 (110) || Loss
|-
!Round 18
| Toora (A) || 15.14 (104) – 16.10 (106) || Win
|}

Individual awards

Moore Medal winners
 Paul Sutherland (1969, 1972)
 Wayne Lynch (1991)

AFL Leading Goalkicker winners
 Ron Tibballs (1964, 1969, 1970)

VFL players to come from Welshpool

Neil ChandlerPlaying career: 1968–1974 (Carlton 1968–74, St Kilda 1974)Games: 82 (Carlton 76, St. Kilda 6)Goals: 25 (Carlton 22, St. Kilda 3)

A three time premiership player with Carlton, Chandler played 76 games for the Blues including the 1968, 1970 and 1972 premierships. He also played in the 1973 Grand Final team that lost to Richmond by 30 points. In 1974, Chandler played four games with the Blues before gaining a clearance to St Kilda where he added a further six games to his VFL career before returning home to Welshpool in 1975.

Laurie RipponPlaying career: 1969–1973 (Footscray)Games: 45 (Footscray 45)Goals: 4 (Footscray 4)

Another product that came out of the Welshpool juniors to make it to the VFL/AFL. Didn't quite reach the success of Chandler but still managed to be a premiership player for the Bulldogs after Footscray defeated Richmond for the 1970 Night Premiership. In 1975, Rippn returned to his native Bulldogs where he coached the club to a preliminary final loss to Woodside. Rippon eventually moved on to play at Woodside and Devon in later years.

Max ParkerPlaying career: 1971 (Footscray)Games: 5 (Footscray 5)Goals:''' 6 (Footscray 6)

Became an inspirational legend of SANFL club, Woodville. Parker was initial recruited by Footscray for the 1971 VFL season and played 5 games during the season as a ruckman but found it hard to crack a regular spot against the likes of Gary Dempsey and Barry Round. He became a part of the Ray Huppatz swap and then forged a remarkable career with Woodville that spanned over 250 games for the Eagles. Captained the club in 1982 and again in 1986–87 under the tutelage of VFL/AFL legend, Malcolm Blight. Max made a short return to the Welshpool Football Club in 1990 with a handful of games played before his career eventually closed.

References

Australian rules football clubs in Victoria (Australia)
1995 disestablishments in Australia